Dobiran Rural District is a rural district (dehestan) in the Central District of Zarrin Dasht County, Fars Province, Iran. At the 2006 census, its population was 2,160, in 481 families.  The rural district has 18 villages.

References 

Rural Districts of Fars Province
Zarrin Dasht County